July 2012

See also

References

 07
July 2012 events in the United States